Charles Knowles is the name of:

Sir Charles Knowles, 1st Baronet (1704–1777), Royal Navy admiral
Sir Charles Knowles, 2nd Baronet (1754–1831), Royal Navy admiral
Sir Charles Knowles, 4th Baronet (1832–1917), Royal Navy admiral
Charles Knowles (British Army officer) (1835–1924), British general

See also
 Knollys family
 Baron Knollys, subsidiary title to the Earl of Banbury created in the Peerage of England
 Viscount Knollys, title created in the Peerage of the United Kingdom
 Knollys baronets, two Baronetcies created in the Baronetage of Great Britain
 Knowles (disambiguation)